Lisa Yvette Calderon (née Rodriguez) (born January 25, 1965) is an American politician serving in the California State Assembly. She is a Democrat representing the 57th Assembly District, which encompasses the Gateway Cities and portions of the San Gabriel Valley, including Whittier, South El Monte, and Hacienda Heights. In December 2019, she announced that she would be running in the 2020 election, following the retirement of her stepson, Ian Calderon.

Personal life
She is the wife of former Assemblymember and State Senator Charles Calderon and stepmother of former Assemblymember and Majority Leader Ian Calderon. She has two other sons, Matthew and Brennan. She worked as a Government Affairs Director for Edison International from 1996 until 2020 and previously was a legislative aide to former California State Assembly Speaker Willie Brown from 1990 until 1996.

References

External links
Join California Lisa Calderon

1965 births
Lisa
Democratic Party members of the California State Assembly
Hispanic and Latino American state legislators in California
Hispanic and Latino American women in politics
Living people
21st-century American politicians
21st-century American women politicians
California State University, Sacramento alumni